Pipra is a village in West Champaran district in the Indian state of Bihar.

Demographics
As of 2011 India census, Pipra had a population of 2549 in 429 households. Males constitute 52.8% of the population and females 47.1%. Pipra has an average literacy rate of 48.5%, lower than the national average of 74%: male literacy is 60.8%, and female literacy is 39.1%. In Pipra, 20.4% of the population is under 6 years of age.

References

Villages in West Champaran district